Matty Mullins is the first full-length album by American rock musician Matty Mullins which was released September 23, 2014 by Rise Records.
The album debuted at number 66 on the Billboard 200.

Track listing
All lyrics written by Matty Mullins

Personnel
Credits adapted from AllMusic.

 Matty Mullins – lead vocals, producer, composer
 Cameron Mizell – additional vocals, producer, mixing, mastering, engineering, composer
 Matt "Scoop" Roberts – guitar, composer
 Shayne Garcia – photography
 Jeremy Tremp – cover photo

References

2014 albums